The Trans-Atlantic Data Privacy Framework is a forthcoming European Union–United States data transfer framework that was agreed to in 2022. Previous such regimes—the EU–US Privacy Shield (2016–2020) and the International Safe Harbor Privacy Principles (2000–2015)—were declared invalid by the European Court of Justice due to concerns that personal data leaving EU borders is subject to sweeping US government surveillance. The Trans-Atlantic Data Privacy Framework is intended to address these concerns.

Since the invalidation of the EU–US Privacy Shield in July 2020, companies wishing to transfer data between the EU and the US "have faced confusion, higher compliance costs, and challenges for EU-US business relationships".

In October 2022 Joe Biden signed an executive order to implement the framework. A ratification process by the European Commission is expected to take up to six months. An influential European board has approved the draft.

Data Protection Review Court
The Data Protection Review Court (DPRC) is a three-judge panel, established in Executive Order 14086, which will deal with appeals made to the decisions of the Civil Liberties Protection Officer of the Office of the Director of National Intelligence as described by the Trans-Atlantic Data Privacy Framework. The decisions made by the DPRC have binding authority.

See also

Data Protection Directive
Digital privacy
General Data Protection Regulation
Safe harbor (law)

References

External links
Questions & Answers: EU-U.S. Data Privacy Framework by the European Commission

Information privacy
International law
Privacy law